This is a list of those who bore the title Count of Soissons and ruled Soissons and its civitas or diocese as a county in the Middle Ages. The title continued in use into modern times, but without ties to the actual Soissonnais.

Carolingians
896– Herbert I, Count of Vermandois
–930 Herbert II, Count of Vermandois, son of the previous
969–988 Guy I, son of the previous.

Angevins
988–1047 Adelise, daughter of the previous.

Bar-sur-Aube
until 1019 Nocher I, jure uxoris, husband of the previous
1019-1042 Renaud I, son of the previous
1042-1057 Guy II, son of the previous
1057–1079 Adelaide, sister of the previous.

Normans
1076 William Busac, also Count of Eu, jure uxoris, husband of the previous
1076-1099 Renaud II, son of the previous
1099-1115 John I, brother of the previous
1115-1141 Renaud III, son of the previous.

House of Nesle
1141–1178 Yves II le Vieux (the Old), great-grandson of William Busac
1178–1180 Conon, nephew of the previous
1180–1235 Raoul le Bon, brother of the previous
1235–1270 John II le Bègue (the Stammerer), son of the previous
1270–1284 John III, son of the previous 
1284–1289 John IV, son of the previous
1289–1298 John V, son of the previous
1298–1306 Hugh, brother of the previous
1306–1344 Margaret, daughter of the previous.

Avesnes
1317-1344 John of Beaumont, jure uxoris, husband of the previous
1344–1350 Jeanne de Hainaut, daughter of the previous
1344-1346 Louis II, also Count of Blois, jure uxoris, husband of the previous.

Châtillon
1346-1350 Louis III, also Count of Blois, son of the previous
1350–1367 Guy II, also Count of Blois, brother of the previous.
After the Battle of Poitiers, Louis III sold the County of Soissons to Engeurrand VII in order to ransom his brother Guy.

Coucy
1367–1397 Enguerrand VII, Lord of Coucy
1397–1405 Marie de Coucy

Dukes of Orléans
1404–1407 Louis
1407–1412 Charles (died 1465)

Dukes of Bar
1412–1415 Robert de Marle, son of Henry of Bar and Marie de Coucy
1415–1462 Jeanne de Marle

Dukes of Luxembourg
1462–1476 John VI
1476–1482 Peter II of Saint-Pol 
1482–1547 Mary II (died 1547)

Princes of Condé

1487–1495 François, jure uxoris
1495–1537 Charles, Duke of Vendôme, jure matris
1547–1557 Jean VII 
1557–1569 Louis de Bourbon, Prince of Condé, brother of prec.
1569–1612 Charles de Bourbon
1612–1641 Louis de Bourbon
1641–1656 Marie de Bourbon, Princess of Carignano (died 1692), sister of prec.

Princes of Carignano

1641–1656 Thomas Francis (1596-1656), jure uxoris
1646/50–1656 Joseph Emmanuel, titular count, son of prec.
1656–1673 Eugène Maurice, brother of prec.
1673–1702 Louis Thomas, son of prec.
1702–1729 Emmanuel Thomas
1729–1734 Eugène Jean François

References